The 1929 Colgate football team was an American football team that represented Colgate University as an independent during the 1929 college football season. In its first season under head coach Andrew Kerr, the team compiled an 8–1 record, shut out seven of nine opponents, and outscored all opponents by a total of 315 to 19. John Cox was the team captain. The team played its home games on Whitnall Field in Hamilton, New York.

Schedule

References

Colgate
Colgate Raiders football seasons
Colgate football